Vettaikaaran is a 2009 Indian Tamil-language action film directed by debutant B. Babusivan and produced by AVM Productions. The film stars Vijay and Anushka, with Srihari, Salim Ghouse, Sayaji Shinde and Ravi Shankar in supporting roles. Gopinath handled cinematography while V. T. Vijayan was the film's editor. This was Vijay's first film with AVM Productions. This was the only film B. Babusivan had directed in his life until his death on 16 September 2020.

The film released to mixed reviews but was a commercial success. The film has collected $1,399,911 at the overseas box office. The story is a tale of unexpected events in the life of auto rickshaw driver due to conspiracy by a crime boss, and how he manages to escape from him.

Plot
Ravi is a youngster from Thoothukudi who aspires to become a police officer like his role model, Encounter Specialist DCP Devaraj IPS. After completing his PUC, he joins a college in Chennai and also earns a living by driving an auto rickshaw. During the course, he meets Suseela, an IT professional and falls in love with her.

Although Suseela rejects Ravi's advances at first, with the help of her grandmother, Ravi succeeds in winning Suseela's heart. Meanwhile, Chella is a gangster and womaniser, meets Ravi's friend Uma in a public place, where she is taking donations for some cause, and immediately develops an attraction to her. When Uma asks Chella to contribute money, he willingly donates by inserting a rupee note in her jacket. Uma feels shamed and tells to her father what happened.

Ravi finds out what had happened to Uma through her father, he comes to her defense and beats up Chella, hospitalising him. His troubles start from there as Chella's father, a powerful don named Vedanayagam, with the help of his right-hand man, a corrupt police officer Kattabomman, begin to create havoc in Ravi's life. Ravi is soon thrown into jail on a false case of drug smuggling and is expelled from college.

Suseela is willing to help him where she goes to Devaraj and pleads with him to help Ravi, but Devaraj initially refuses to help as his entire family had died at the hands of Vedanayagam and he himself was blinded by him because he had taken action against him and his gang. However, with the help of his people known in the police department, He saves Ravi from being killed in a fake encounter led by Kattabomman. It is at this stage that Ravi takes up a new persona called Police Ravi to clean up the illegal activities of Vedanayagam and instill hope in the public, something that Devaraj was unable to do.

In the process however, Vedanayagam kills Ravi's close friend Sugu, prompting Ravi to kill Chella in retribution. Vedanayagam decides to become a minister, in order to prevent Ravi from targeting him and his activities. As Ravi finally plans to kill the newly sworn-in minister Vedanayagam, The police arrive to arrest him. However, Ravi sees Devaraj in the crowd and announces Vedanayagam's location to him just as he is being arrested, allowing Devaraj to assassinate Vedanayagam, effectively avenging his family's death. Devaraj is reinstated into the police force and offers to make Ravi a police officer. However, Ravi refuses, stating that he has found the police officer within himself and that is all he needs to succeed in life.

Cast

Production

Development
During the filming of Kuruvi, directed by S. Dharani, B. Babusivan served as one of his assistant directors in the film and wrote the dialogues. Sivan was later prompted to begin his maiden directorial venture with Vijay in the lead role. He was eventually chosen as the director for the next feature film to be produced AVM Productions. The project was originally titled as Police Ravi but in August 2008 it was re-titled as Vettaikkaaran, taken from the Vettaikaaran (1964 film) starring M. G. Ramachandran.

Vettaikaran was formally launched the next month. The film's director Babusivan, producers M. Balasubramaniam and B. Gurunath Meyyappan, Vijay and his wife, Vijay Antony, S. A. Chandrasekhar and director Dharani were present at the film's inauguration.

Casting
Commercial directors Perarasu and Hari were mentioned, but AVM Productions chose B. Babusivan to be the director of the film.

Anushka waa selected as lead female role opposite to Vijay for the very first time. Cinematographer Gopinath was chosen to be the lead cameraman in the film after Ravi Varman was dropped from the film. V. T. Vijayan was signed as the film's editor.

Filming
Vijay experimented with his look in two songs. In "Karigalan", the left half of his body is a man where the right half is a female. The song is also notable for featuring Vijay without a moustache in his career as of date. The look in Karigalan was suggested by Dinesh after he watched Aamir Khan in a Tata Sky advertisement. In "Oru Chinna Thamarai", Vijay sports a long hair wig. Regarding his long hair look, Vijay reveals that he "always wanted to" try long hair.

Soundtrack

Soundtrack was composed by Vijay Antony and met with a positive response.

Release

Critical reception
Sify gave the film a 4/5 star rating, and wrote the "major plus for the movie are the five peppy songs tuned by Vijay Antony which are choreographed well ... The action scenes by Kanal Kannan are superbly choreographed. Gopinath’s camera is slick and editing is fast-paced". Behindwoods rated 4/5 and stated "The charismatic screen presence of Vijay, enjoyable musical tracks, sparkling stunts, fiery punch lines, the signature lighter moments and foot tapping numbers, makes the movie entertain the family audience, and stated that director B. Babusivan had made a wholesome family entertainer movie. The Times of India gave 3.5 stars out of 5 criticising Babusivan for failing to properly tell the story in the second half. Ananda Vikatan rated the film 38 out of 100.

Dubbed versions 
The film was dubbed in Hindi as Dangerous Khiladi 3 and was released on 2014.

Accolades

References

External links

2009 directorial debut films
2009 films
2009 action films
Indian action films
2000s masala films
2000s Tamil-language films
Films scored by Vijay Antony
AVM Productions films